Dănceni is a village in Ialoveni District, Moldova. It is located on the bank of a retention basin of the Isnovăț river which is called Lake Danceni. The lake has a capacity of 4 million m3 and a surface area of 2.2 km2.

Notable people
 Teodor Neaga, member Sfatul Țării 
 Andrei Vartic 
 Alexandru Corduneanu

References

Villages of Ialoveni District